This is a list of notable people from Chad.


A

 Abdelwahid Aboud Mackaye: (born 1953), rebel insurgent leader
 Acyl Ahmat Agbas: (1944–1982), Foreign Minister 1979–1981
 Salma Khalil Alio: (born 1982), poet

B

 Aziza Baroud: UN Representative
 Mohamed Baghlani: (leader of the Volcan Army, died 1977)
 Jean Alingué Bawoyeu: (born 1937), Prime Minister 1991–1992
 Lydie Beassemda (born c. 1967), women's rights activist and government minister
 Mahamoud Adam Béchir: Chad's Ambassador to South Africa since 2012, formerly the Chadian Ambassador to the United States from 2004 to 2012.
 Outel Bono: (liberal politician, died 1973)
 Mariam Brahim: (born 1956), physician

C
 Issa Serge Coelo: (born 1967), film director

D

 Dunama Dabbalemi: (emperor of Kanem 1221–1259)
 Brahim Déby: son of Chadian President Idriss Déby
 Idriss Déby: (1952–2021)
 Yaya Dillo Djérou: leader of the insurgent group Platform for Change, Unity and Democracy
 Koibla Djimasta: (born 1950), Prime Minister 1995–97
 Negue Djogo: (head of the Chadian Armed Forces)
 Jacques Doumro: (head of the Chadian Armed Forces)

G
 Pierre Toura Gaba: (1920–1998), former Secretary General of the Chadian Progressive Party, Chadian ambassador to Germany from 1966 to 1973, Chadian ambassador to the United States from 1976 to 1979

H
 Hissène Habré

I
 Mahamat Idriss

K 

 Wadel Abdelkader Kamougué
 Saleh Kebzabo
 Djibrine Kerallah
 Delwa Kassiré Koumakoye
 Grace Kodindo: (born 1960), obstetrician
 Alphonse Kotiga
 Ahmed Koulamallah
 Marie-Christine Koundja: (born 1957), writer

L

 Gabriel Lisette
 Rose Lokissim: one of the first Chadian elite soldiers, she fought against Hissène Habré's dictatorship in the 1980s, was captured, tortured, and ultimately executed
 Elise Loum: (born 1956), Vice-President of the African Union's Pan-African Parliament

M

 Félix Malloum
 Hassan Abdallah Mardigue
 Idriss Miskine
 Fidèle Moungar
 Mariam Ali Moussa: Minister and Ambassador to Germany and Austria
 Ahmed Hassan Musa

N

 Kaltouma Nadjina
 Japhet N'Doram
 Mahamat Nour

O

 Noël Milarew Odingar
 Othman I: ruled the Kanem-Bornu Empire from 1356 to 1369 during the Sayfawa dynasty
 Othman II: ruled the Kanem-Bornu Empire from 1369 to 1371 during the Sayfawa dynasty
 Othman III: ruled the Kanem-Bornu Empire from 1463 to 1473 during the Sayfawa dynasty
 Nassour Guelendouksia Ouaido
 Goukouni Oueddei

R
 Aboubakar Abdel Rahmane: Chadian warlord and founder of FROLINAT who was active during the civil war (1966–1993)

S

 Gontchomé Sahoulba
 Ibni Oumar Mahamat Saleh
 Joseph Brahim Seid
 Lol Mohamed Shawa
 Abba Siddick
 Achta Djibrine Sy

T

 Youssouf Togoïmi
 Nabatingue Toko
 François Tombalbaye
 Khadidja Touré

Y

 Nagoum Yamassoum
 Pascal Yoadimnadji
 Joseph Yodoyman
 Ngarlejy Yorongar

See also
Heads of state of Chad
Sayfawa dynasty

References